Doune was a railway station located in Doune, in the council area of Stirling, Scotland.

The station was rebuilt in typical Caledonian Railway style in the early 1900s after the completion of the Callander and Oban Railway in 1880. It closed on 1 November 1965 and was demolished around 1968. The site was used by a timber merchant for many years. In the late 1990s a private housing estate was built on the station site. Although little or no trace of the station remains, the station house still stands at the entrance to the housing development.

References

Sources
 
 

Buildings and structures demolished in 1968
Disused railway stations in Stirling (council area)
Beeching closures in Scotland
Railway stations in Great Britain closed in 1965
Railway stations in Great Britain opened in 1858
Former Caledonian Railway stations
Doune
Kilmadock